"Why I'm Walkin'" is a song written and performed by Stonewall Jackson and released on the Columbia label (catalog no. 4–41591). It debuted on the Billboard country and western chart in April 1960, peaked at the No. 6 spot, and remained on the chart for a total of 17 weeks.

References

Stonewall Jackson (musician) songs
1960 songs